Joaquín Messi (born 16 April 2002) is an Argentine footballer contracted to Newell's Old Boys.

Nicknamed The Other Messi, and The New Messi, he has gained notoriety due to coincidentally having the same surname, being the same nationality, coming from the same hometown, having the same shirt number and starting his professional career at the same club as the world famous Lionel Messi. The two players share no relation.

This coincidence has resulted in an unprecedented amount of interest in the player and pressure, for a player of such calibre.

He debuted in the U-20 Copa Libertadores on 8 February 2022 against Paraguayan club Guaraní.

References

Living people
2002 births
Argentine footballers
Footballers from Rosario, Santa Fe
Newell's Old Boys footballers
Association football midfielders